Buibui is a genus of African araneomorph spiders in the family Cyatholipidae, and was first described by C. E. Griswold in 2001.

Species
 it contains five species:
Buibui abyssinica Griswold, 2001 – Ethiopia
Buibui claviger Griswold, 2001 (type) – Kenya
Buibui cyrtata Griswold, 2001 – Congo
Buibui kankamelos Griswold, 2001 – Cameroon, Equatorial Guinea (Bioko)
Buibui orthoskelos Griswold, 2001 – Congo

References

Araneomorphae genera
Cyatholipidae
Spiders of Africa